Julius Masimba Musodza (born 29 March 1976) is a Zimbabwean author.

Life 
Musodza was born at the cusp of the emergence of the new Zimbabwe, the eldest son of a senior civil servant in the Ministry of Lands. The Musodza family are of the Buja people of Mutoko , north east Zimbabwe. Reading was encouraged in the Musodza household. He was educated at Avondale Primary School, Harare and St Mary Magdalene's High School, Nyanga. After school, he trained as a screenwriter, selling his first screenplay to Media For Development Trust in 2002. Barely a month after, as political and socio-economic uncertainty engulfed Zimbabwe, Musodza relocated to the United Kingdom, where he has lived ever since. He lives in the North East England town of Middlesbrough.

Writing 
An avid reader as a child, Musodza aspired to be a writer from the time he discovered that it was possible to earn a living from it. Musodza has contributed to StoryTime e-zine, which was founded by Sweden-based Zimbabwean author and publisher, Ivor Hartmann., Jungle Jim, Bookends, Winter Tales and other periodicals.

He is also the author of the first definitive science fiction novel in the Shona language, MunaHacha Maive Nei? Musodza states that he began to write science-fiction in ChiShona when he was 10, when he translated Mary Shelley's Frankenstein for his maternal grandmother. His use of ChiShona challenges the widely-held perception that indigenous languages lack the "sophistication" with which to conceptualise and articulate "complex" ideas such as are found in science-fiction. He has also stated that he is inspired by Ngũgĩ wa Thiong'o's Decolonising The Mind. Musodza explores writing science -fiction in ChiShona in an essay,  Writing and Publishing 'Complicated Stuff' in an African Language, which appeared in Vector 289, the magazine of the British Fantasy Association He is one of two Zimbabwean writers who have been featured in Geoff Ryman's 100 African Writers of SF

In addition to two personal blogs, Musodza, an advocate for Zionism, blogs for The Times of Israel. He has taken part in the Battle for Ideas Festival

Novels and novellas 
  Aquilina (kana kuti, Reuriro yaHatifari Maforimbo), 2020, Belontos Books, 
  Shavi Rechikadzi, 2015, Belontos Books, 
  MunaHacha Maive Nei? (2nd edition), 2016, Belontos Books, 
 Uriah's Vengeance, Lion Press, 2009, Coventry, United Kingdom

Short fiction 
 Black Tax, Agbowo, Issue 6, November 2022, Y, Nigeria, 2022
 Ronak's Shame, Lolwe Literary Magazine, Nairobi, Kenya, 2022
 The Sandship Builders Of Chitungwiza, Save The World: Twenty Sci-Fi Writers Save The Planet, ed. J.Scott Coatsworth, Other Worlds Ink, United States, 2022
 Here I Am, My Son, Sticks & Stones Magazine, Bright Lights Media House, United Kingdom, 2022
 Warrior Mine, Omenana Speculative Fiction Magazine, Vol. 19, Seven Hills Media, Nigeria, 2021
 Tek-Tek's Game, Other Side of Hope Vol 1, Other Side Of Hope Publishing, United Kingdom, 2021
 What Bastet Saw, Undead Press, online, 2021
 Imba YaSekuru Browne, Mosi-oa-Tunya Literary Review, Zimbabwe, 2021
 The Rapture of Pastor Agregate Makunike, Chitungwiza Musha Mukuru: An Anthology From Zimbabwe's Biggest Ghetto Town, Mwanaka Publishing, Chitungwiza, Zimbabwe, 2020
 Aquilina (kana kuti, Reururo yaHatifari Maforimbo, Belontos Books, United Kingdom, 2019,  
 The Witch of Eskale Hall, "Creep" anthology, ed. Jay Chakravarti, Culture Cult Magazine, India, 2019, 
 The Interplanetary Water Company, AfroSFv3, 2018, StoryTime, 
 African Roar (Anthology, contributed Yesterday's Dog, a short-story) edited by E. Sigauke/I.W. Hartmann, Lion Press, 2010, 
 Here be Cannibals, Jungle Jim #23, Afreak Press, Cape Town, Republic of South Africa,2014
 When the Trees were Enchanted, Winter Tales, Fox Spirit Books, London, United Kingdom, 2014
 Chishamiso, Bookends, The Sunday Observer, Kingston, Jamaica, 2012
 To The Woods, With A Girl, StoryTime e-zine, Sweden
 In The Blood, StoryTime e-zine, Sweden, 2008
 Framed, StoryTime e-zine, Sweden, 2008 
 The Village Idiot, Trends, Bulawayo, 2006

Acting 
Masimba Musodza's professional acting debut was in Edgar Langeveldt's play, No News, which premiered at Theatre-In-The-Park, Harare, in 1997. He also appears in a short film, Vengeance is Mine (2001) by Tawanda Gunda. However, it was not until he settled in Middlesbrough that he began to pursue acting more seriously. He appeared in a short play, To Be Or Not To Be, written by compatriot Dictator Maphosa, as part of the Middlesbrough Council-sponsored Boro Bites short plays (August, 2010). In 2011, he joined the Arc Sketch Group, an extension of the Writers Block North East workshops, which put on themed sketch shows at the Arc Theatre, Stockton-on-Tees until it disbanded in 2012.

Since then, Masimba Musodza has been a film and TV extra, appearing in such productions as Beowulf: Return to the Shieldlands (Episode 11), where he plays a Vani warrior. He can also be seen in the festival teaser and UK trailer for Ken Loach's I, Daniel Blake. He has also appeared in Make! Craft Britain, which was aired on BBC4 on June 9, 2016. His most recent appearance has been in the short film I Need help (Ben Stainsby, 2018), where he plays 'The Wise Man'

References

External links
 Masimba Musodza at the Internet Speculative Fiction Database
 Interview with Musodza
 Musodza's website
 A Moment With Masimba Musodza

Zimbabwean writers
Zimbabwean novelists
Zimbabwean male writers
Male novelists
Zimbabwean male actors
Zimbabwean Rastafarians
Zimbabwean emigrants to the United Kingdom
People from Harare
Living people
1976 births